Willie C. Carpenter is an American actor. He is perhaps best known for his recurring roles on Reasonable Doubts as Robert Maxwell, 1600 Penn as General Maurer, and Devious Maids as Kenneth Miller.

Filmography

References

External links

Living people
American male film actors
American male television actors
20th-century American male actors
21st-century American male actors
American male stage actors
American male video game actors
Place of birth missing (living people)
1938 births